Jerram is a surname. Notable people with the surname include:

 Arnold Escombe Jerram 1906–1910
 Charles Jerram, Church of England vicar
 Dougal Jerram (born 1969), British earth scientist
 George Jerram (1904–1948), Australian rules footballer
 Luke Jerram, modern installation artist
 Martyn Jerram (1858–1933), Royal Navy officer
 Mary Jerram, Australian State Coroner
 Nigel Jerram (1900–1968), English cricketer
 Sidney Jerram (1891—1959), Welsh rugby player